The 1979 Italian Grand Prix was a Formula One motor race held on 9 September 1979 at Monza. It was the thirteenth race of the 1979 World Championship of F1 Drivers and the 1979 International Cup for F1 Constructors.

The 50-lap race was won by South African Jody Scheckter, driving a Ferrari, with Canadian team-mate Gilles Villeneuve second and Swiss Clay Regazzoni third in a Williams-Ford. Scheckter claimed the Drivers' Championship in the process, while Ferrari clinched the Constructors' Championship. The race also marked Scheckter's final race win; he retired after the following season.

This race marked Scuderia Ferrari's 300th start in a World Championship event as a team.

Report

Background
Monza was revamped for 1979, with the track re-surfaced and run-off areas added to the Curva Grande and the Lesmo curves.

The entry list was enlarged by the return of the Alfa Romeo team, which had participated in the Belgian and French Grands Prix earlier in the season. Alfa Romeo fielded two cars: a new 179 chassis for Bruno Giacomelli, and the old 177 for Vittorio Brambilla, back in action for the first time since the crash in the previous year's race at Monza that had claimed the life of Ronnie Peterson. Meanwhile, Mexican Héctor Rebaque had his HR100 chassis ready for the first time, while Switzerland's Marc Surer, having won the Formula Two championship the previous month, made his first Formula One appearance as Ensign took him on in place of Patrick Gaillard.

Qualifying
The turbo-powered Renaults were quick in qualifying and filled the front row of the grid, with Jean-Pierre Jabouille ahead of René Arnoux. It was Jabouille's fourth pole position of the season, and Renault's sixth. Scheckter and Alan Jones in the Williams made up the second row, while on the third were their respective teammates, Gilles Villeneuve and Clay Regazzoni. The top ten was completed by Jacques Laffite in the Ligier, the Brabhams of Nelson Piquet and Niki Lauda, and Mario Andretti in the Lotus.

Race
The Renaults were slow off the start line and so Scheckter took the lead, with Arnoux holding on to second. Jones also made a poor start and dropped to the back of the field, putting Villeneuve third and the fast-starting Laffite fourth. On lap 2, Arnoux passed Scheckter for the lead, while Piquet crashed out after tangling with Regazzoni. Regazzoni was slow out of Curva Grande and Piquet took an outside line to keep his speed. Regazzoni moved across, possibly unaware Piquet was there, and sent the Brazilian heavily into the barriers, with the Brabham ending in two halves either side of the track. Fortunately Piquet was unhurt, and Regazzoni continued in the race.

For the next eleven laps Arnoux, Scheckter, Villeneuve, Laffite and Jabouille ran nose-to-tail, with Regazzoni a distant sixth. Then, on lap 13, Arnoux's engine began to misfire, leading to his retirement. Scheckter thus regained the lead, with Villeneuve dutifully following him. Later in the race, Laffite and Jabouille also suffered engine failures, promoting Regazzoni to third.

Scheckter eventually took the chequered flag half a second ahead of Villeneuve and, with it, the Drivers' Championship. This one-two finish for Ferrari in their home race also secured them the Constructors' Championship. Regazzoni finished four seconds behind Villeneuve and 50 ahead of Lauda, with the final points going to Andretti and Jean-Pierre Jarier in the Tyrrell.

Qualifying

Qualifying classification

Race

Classification

Championship standings after the race

Drivers' Championship standings

Constructors' Championship standings

References

Italian Grand Prix
Italian Grand Prix
Italian Grand Prix
Italian Grand Prix